Thomas Thompson (1773–1816) was a Tyneside poet, from Bishop Auckland area in County Durham.  His last song was Jemmy Joneson's Whurry, first published in 1823, seven years after his death.

Early life 
Thomas Thompson was born in 1773 in (or close to) Bishop Auckland, County Durham, the son of an officer who was already suffering from (what would turn out to be, a terminal) fever at the time of Thomas’ birth.  He finished his education at Durham and then moved to Newcastle upon Tyne c 1790.  Already a well-known and respected business man, and with the threat of war with, and invasion from, France, Thomas joined up in the Newcastle Light Horse as acting quartermaster, with a quick promotion following to rank of captain.

Later life 
Thomas Thompson was married and had (at least one) a son Robert born c1812.  He built and lived in Cotfield House, Windmill Hills, Gateshead.  Thompson became a successful merchant trader with offices in the Broad Chare, Skinners Burn, Forth Banks. In 1796 he had connections with a woollen draper, Mr D Bell, and in 1801 was trading as a general merchant trading as Armstrong, Thompson & Co.  He was also known for his voluntary work in the area.  He died on 9 January 1816 aged 42 at his home from exertion, cold and fatigue & similar, after trying to protect his property after an instance of the River Tyne flooding.  He was buried at Old St Johns.

Works
His songs include:
The New Keel Row
Canny Newcastle
Newcastle election song 1812
Jemmy Joneson’s Whurry

See also 
Geordie dialect words
William Purvis (Blind Willie)

References

External links
FARNE Folk Archive Resource North East
Marshall’s Collection of songs chiefly in the Newcastle dialect'
Palmer’s The Tyne and its tributaries

1773 births
1816 deaths
English male poets
English singers
English songwriters
Geordie songwriters
People from Bishop Auckland